Bernt Ingvaldsen (12 October 1902  –  24 April 1985) was a Norwegian politician for the Conservative Party.

He was born in Trondheim.

He was elected to the Norwegian Parliament from the Market towns of Buskerud county in 1950, and was re-elected on six occasions. He was President of the Storting from 1965 to 1972, and from 1972 to 1973 he was Vice President.

On the local level Ingvaldsen was a member of Drammen city council from 1945 to 1959.

He was a member of the Norwegian Nobel Committee from 1967 to 1970, and served as vice chairman of it from 1970 to 1975. Together with Sjur Lindebrække he worked to undermine Hélder Câmara as a candidate, cooperating with the Brazilian ambassador in Oslo as the military dictatorship in Brazil was vehemently against Câmara receiving the Nobel peace prize.

References

1902 births
1985 deaths
Members of the Storting
Conservative Party (Norway) politicians
Politicians from Drammen
Politicians from Trondheim
Norwegian Institute of Technology alumni
Chairpersons of the Norwegian Nobel Committee
Presidents of the Storting
Vice Presidents of the Storting
20th-century Norwegian politicians